Wutong may refer to:

Mythology
Wutong Shen, a group of five sinister deities from southern China
The Wutong Spirits, a Strange Tales from a Chinese Studio story based on the Wutong Shen
Another Wutong Spirit, another Strange Tales story

Plants
Firmiana simplex, or the Chinese parasol tree
Platanus × acerifolia, known in China as the French wutong, or simply wutong

Places
 Wutong, Yongzhou, a subdistrict and  the seat of Lengshuitan District in Yongzhou City, China
 Wutong, Tongxiang, a subdistrict and  the seat of Tongxiang City in Zhejiang Province, China
 Wutong Mountain, a mountain in Shenzhen, Guangdong Province, China